Gloria Callen (December 21, 1923 in Freeport, New York – September 2, 2016), was a backstroke swimmer from the United States. She was the 1942 Associated Press Athlete of the Year.

Biography
"Glamorous" Gloria Marie Callen was born in 1923. She married Herbert Erskine Jones Jr. in 1944.

Gloria Callen set 35 American records and one world record in swimming, and won 13 American championships. Due to World War II, she was never able to compete in world championships or Olympic Games, even though she qualified for the 1940 Olympic Games. She quit swimming when she went to college at Barnard College and joined the American Women's Voluntary Services.

Gloria Callen was one in a row of glamorous swimming champions, and was voted one of America's 13 best-dressed women by the New York's Fashion Academy.

Honours
1942: Associated Press Athlete of the Year
1976: inducted in the Rockland County Sports Hall of Fame
1984: International Swimming Hall of Fame Honor Swimmer

See also
 List of members of the International Swimming Hall of Fame

References

1923 births
2016 deaths
American female swimmers
Barnard College alumni
21st-century American women